The Medical Worker Day (Russian: День медицинского работника, Den' Meditsinskava Rabotnika) is a professional holiday of medical staff which used to be celebrated in the Soviet Union and still continues to be celebrated in many post-Soviet countries. In most cases, date of the celebration is the third Sunday of June.

History 
The Medical Worker Day has been celebrated since 1988, when Supreme Soviet of the Soviet Union edited its decree "About commemorative dates and observances" dated 1980.

Country coverage 
Currently, the Medical Worker Day is officially celebrated in Russia, Belarus, Ukraine, Kazakhstan, Latvia, Moldova, Armenia, and Azerbaijan. It is celebrated every year on the third Sunday of June in all the above countries besides Azerbaijan (on June 17 annually).

See also 

 International Nurses Day
 National Doctors' Day

References 

Observances in Russia
Observances in Kazakhstan
Observances in Moldova
Observances in Ukraine
Observances in Latvia
Observances in Armenia
Public holidays in Belarus
Public holidays in Azerbaijan
Public holidays in the Soviet Union